This is a list footballers who have played 100 times or more for Reading Football Club.

Key 
 The list is sorted by the year the player joined the club. If more than one player joined in the same year then they are sorted alphabetically.

Club years
 Counted as the years the player signed for, and left the club.

Appearances and goals
 League and total appearances prior to the Second World War are sourced to Joyce (2004), from 1946–47 to 1989–90 to the Post War English & Scottish Football League A–Z Players Database, from 1990–91 to 1995–96 to Royals Record, and for the 1996–97 season onwards to Soccerbase. Reading's top 10 all time appearances makers and goalscorers are listed on the club's official website, while statistics of selected players from all era's are also available at the Reading F.C. Former Players' Association.

International career
 Players who made international appearances only have the highest level at which they played listed.
 A player's senior international team is sourced to National Football Teams whilst appearances at age group level are sourced to the Association of Football Statisticians. Players not covered by the above are sourced as needed in the "Refs" column.

Players with 100 or more appearances

Players with fewer than 100 appearances

Notes

References

Players
 
Reading
Association football player non-biographical articles